James Doherty (born 17 December 1966) is an English actor.

Life and career
Born in Guildford, Surrey, he was educated at Felsted School in Essex and was a member of the National Youth Theatre of Great Britain. He trained at the Guildford School of Acting, graduating in 1989. He is married to TV presenter Joanna Sinnott and together they have two children, Jago (2006) & Nell (2013).

Doherty is best known for his appearances in TV comedy including roles in The Thick Of It, Veep, Rev, Miranda, The Windsors, and the BAFTA winning  Him & Her - The Wedding. His work in feature films includes roles in Backbeat, Verity's Summer, Inbred, Deviation, London Road and the Oscar nominated In the Loop.

He has also appeared in West End musicals including roles in, Les Misérables, The Buddy Holly Story, A Slice of Saturday Night and Marguerite. Doherty played the role of Amos Hart in the West End production of Chicago  at the Cambridge Theatre in 2011 opposite Christie Brinkley. He later reprised this role when the show transferred to the Garrick Theatre playing opposite America Ferrera.

Doherty has appeared in London Road, 50 Years on Stage and Beyond Caring at the National Theatre. In January 2020, Doherty began playing the role of Claude in the multi award-winning Come From Away at the Phoenix Theatre in London. The production was suspended when West End theatres were forced to close on 16 March 2020 as a result of the Coronavirus outbreak.

Credits

Film

Television

Theatre

References

External links

 James Doherty Official Website 
 Interview with James Doherty

1966 births
English male film actors
People educated at Felsted School
English male television actors
English male stage actors
Actors from Guildford
Living people
National Youth Theatre members